Sarab-e Taveh (also Romanized as Sarāb-e Ţāveh; also known as Sarāb-e Tāveh-ye ‘Olyā and Sarāb Tāveh-ye Bālā) is a village in Sarrud-e Jonubi Rural District, in the Central District of Boyer-Ahmad County, Kohgiluyeh and Boyer-Ahmad Province, Iran. At the 2006 census, its population was 5,590, in 1,167 families.

References 

Populated places in Boyer-Ahmad County